John Cornelius O'Callaghan V (born August 4, 1988) is an American singer-songwriter and musician. He is best known for being the lead vocalist, guitarist and pianist of American rock band The Maine which he joined in 2007. He debuted a solo project under the name John the Ghost in 2016.

Early life
O'Callaghan was born in Phoenix, Arizona and was raised there most of his life. He went to ASU for two semesters and then dropped out to join The Maine. Before turning to music, O'Callaghan used to play baseball.

Career
O'Callaghan began his career by auditioning for The Maine with no prior vocal experience. The group has released eight studio albums including You Are OK that reached number one on the Billboard Independent Albums chart. They were featured in various Punk Goes Pop compilation albums. The band won the "Power of Music Award" in 2017 and O'Callaghan spoke about winning the award stating, "For me, awards are never something you should think about unless it's directly impacting you as far as being voted by the people that dig what you do, but for me it's really special because you guys are acknowledging the people that make it all possible for us."

In 2014, he formed a side project along with guitarist Jared Monaco called Eagles in Drag. Their self-titled EP was released in 2014 and peaked at number 35 on the US Heatseekers Albums chart.

In 2016, he began a solo project under the moniker John the Ghost releasing his first single titled, "Sour Grapes" on April 12, 2016. He released his debut extended play, Sincerely, John the Ghost on April 29, 2016. In 2020, O'Callaghan returned to the solo project and released his comeback single "Rolled Down Window". On January 15, 2021, he released his single "Drive" and announced the upcoming release of his debut album, I Only Want to Live Once. Days before the release of his album, he released another single "The Patterns" that featured other previous singles such as "Drive" and "Live Once". O'Callgahn released his debut album, I Only Want to Live Once on February 12, 2021.

In 2017, he was nominated at the Alternative Press Music Awards for "Best Vocalist" but lost to Lynn Gunn of Pvris. O'Callaghan has worked as a composer and songwriter for the band Grayscale. In 2010, O'Callaghan collaborated with photographer Dirk Mai in the creation of Exaltation, a book containing 15 poems written by O'Callaghan complemented by nine accompanying photographs by Mai. He also released a book of poetry titled Sincerely, John The Ghost in 2016 to accompany his solo EP of the same name.

In 2020, O'Callaghan was featured in the Mayday Parade's cover of "I Want to Hold Your Hand" by The Beatles. In 2023, O'Callaghan was featured in a song "ALL CAPS" by Weathers. O'Callaghan also co-produced the track.

Personal life
O'Callaghan got married in October 2020 to Megan Harder. They had their first child, a daughter, the following year in November.

Musical influences
O'Callaghan cites Arizona as his inspiration for music. He stated, "I think Arizona has a heavy effect on everything that I write about. Having the experience of being able to leave Arizona and see other parts of the world made me really appreciate what I have here — the sunsets, the weather and, of course, family and friends. It’s really just a long way of saying that I love Arizona and I feel like I was very fortunate to have been born here and to live here."

Discography
with The Maine

 Can't Stop Won't Stop (2008)
 Black & White (2010)
 Pioneer (2011)
 Forever Halloween (2013)
 American Candy (2015)
 Lovely Little Lonely (2017)
 You Are OK (2019)
 XOXO: From Love and Anxiety in Real Time (2021)

with Eagles in Drag
 Eagles in Drag (2014)

Albums

Extended plays

Singles

Other appearances

References

External links
 

American singers
Pop punk musicians
1988 births
Living people